Grand Hyatt Goa is a five-star deluxe hotel located by Bambolim Bay in Goa, India. Designed in 1990, the construction of the hotel was started initially in 1995 by the Dynamix Group and thereafter on the formation of DB Group. Work was suspended in between for a few years due to a crisis in the real estate sector all over the country. During end 2005, the work was recommenced so as to complete the Project. On December 22, 2009 DB Hospitality signed an agreement with Hyatt International for 5 Hyatt hotels in India.

The hotel was built at a cost of Rs. 5,500 million on 28 acres of landed property at Bambolim, North Goa. It is the largest Hyatt hotel in Goa, India.

History
The property was purchased by the Dynamix Group under their holding company Goan Real Estate and Construction Ltd (later changed to Private Limited Company) during 1992 and 1993.

The plan for a grand hotel was conceptualized during mid 1995 and construction was accordingly commenced after receipt of requisite permissions. The hotel architecture was done by Chandrasekhar Kanetkar.

Occupation of the hotel was obtained on 11 July 2010 and all licenses, permissions etc. were put in place thereafter for commencing operations. The hotel was opened on 1 August 2011.

References

DB Group
Hotels in Goa
Hyatt Hotels and Resorts
Buildings and structures in North Goa district
Hotel buildings completed in 2011